Loutra Elenis (also: Λουτρά Ωραίας Ελένης Loutra Oraias Elenis, lit. the Baths of beautiful Helen) is a village in Corinthia, Greece. It is part of the community of Galataki within the municipal unit of Saronikos. It is situated on the Greek National Road 70 between Corinth and Epidaurus.

External links
GTP - Loutra Elenis

See also
List of settlements in Corinthia

Populated places in Corinthia